Anthony M. Masiello (born April 28, 1947) is an American politician and former basketball player who served as Mayor of Buffalo, New York from 1994 to 2005. Prior to being mayor, he served as a member of the New York State Senate. He is currently president of Masiello, Martucci and Associates, a Buffalo-based lobbying firm.

Early life and education
A Buffalo native, Masiello is the oldest of seven children born to Bridget and Dan Masiello. Masiello graduated from Canisius College in 1969, where he played as a member of the Canisius Golden Griffins men's basketball team. He was then drafted by the Indiana Pacers in the 1969 NBA draft, and played on the team during the 1969–1970 season.

Career
In 1971, Masiello began his career politics when he was elected as a district representative to the Buffalo Common Council. He was subsequently elected to an at-large seat on the council and served as Democratic Majority leader in 1976. He also served as Chairman of the Council Finance Committee.

Masiello was a member of the New York State Senate from 1981 to 1993, sitting in the 184th, 185th, 186th, 187th, 188th, 189th and 190th New York State Legislatures. Masiello's Senate district originally comprised mainly Buffalo and other parts of Erie County, New York. During the final year of his Senate service, his district encompassed part of Buffalo, as well as Grand Island, Niagara Falls and Tonawanda. In the State Senate, Masiello ascended to Minority Whip and served as Chair of the Democratic Conference. As a senator, Masiello served as the Ranking Minority Member of various committees, including the Child Care Committee and the Energy Committee.

Mayor of Buffalo
Masiello was sworn in as the 61st Mayor Buffalo on January 1, 1994. Masiello received 65% of the Democratic Primary vote and 67% of the General Election vote in 1993. He was re-elected to second term in 1997 and again to a third term in 2001 with the joint endorsement of the Democratic and Republican parties.

As mayor, he focused on economic development, governmental restructuring, and education. He cut over 1,000 jobs from the city payroll by restructuring management and the police department.  He successfully sought approval from the state to create a joint construction fund for the city schools, which has been used to renovate and build city schools. He unsuccessfully sought to take control of the Buffalo Board of Education and install his own appointees.

In 1997, Masiello's office, and under the direction of Buffalo State College's Center for Applied Research in Interactive Technologies, launched CityNet, an advanced telecommunications network that links 14 educational and community sites in Buffalo.

In 2005, he announced that he would not run for re-election. He was succeeded by Byron Brown on December 31, 2005. Following his service as mayor, Masiello joined Masiello, Martucci and Associates as president.

Personal life
He is married to Kathleen Masiello (née McCue) of Washingtonville, New York. Anthony has three daughters, Kimberly, Ariel, and Madeline Rose.

References

External links
Biography

1947 births
Living people
Mayors of Buffalo, New York
Democratic Party New York (state) state senators
American people of Italian descent
Canisius College alumni
Canisius Golden Griffins men's basketball players
American athlete-politicians
Buffalo Common Council members
American men's basketball players